The following is a list of live television plays broadcast on Australian broadcaster ABC from its inception in 1956 until 1969. Some were produced in Sydney (on ABN-2), and some were produced in Melbourne (on ABV-2). Most of the Sydney productions were kinescoped so they could be shown in Melbourne, and vice versa. It is not known how many of these kinescope recordings still exist.

Most of the live television plays presented on ABC during the period were adaptations of overseas stage plays, or new versions of works originally aired on BBC television. A few were written locally. The list mainly consists of drama and comedy productions, and also includes several opera presentations.

1950s

1956
The Telephone – first opera broadcast
The Twelve Pound Look – based on play by J.M. Barrie – a play broadcast the first night the ABC went to air

1957

Amahl and the Night Visitors – operaDark Brown – story of unknown originThe Duke in Darkness – adaptation of play by Patrick HamiltonEnding It – adaptation of British playFair Passenger – adaptation of 1955 British TV playA Fourth for BridgeHoliday in BiarritzThe Importance of Being Earnest – adaptation of play by Oscar WildeIn The Zone – adaptation of play by Eugene O'NeillKiller in Close-Up – four episodes broadcast over 1957–58The Passionate Pianist – adaptation of original Australian play by Barbara VernonA Phoenix Too Frequent – adaptation of play by Christopher FryThe Proposal – based on the play A Marriage Proposal by Anton ChekovThe Right PersonRope – adaptation of play by Patrick HamiltonRoundaboutShadow of Doubt – based on a British playThe Sound of ThunderThe Sub-Editor's Room – an original Australian playSunday Costs Five PesosThree Cornered MoonTomorrow's Child
Twelve Pound Look (a different adaptation to the 1956 version)
The Wraith

1958As You AreThe Barber of Seville
Box for OneCaptain CarvalloChance of a GhostCitizen of Westminster – adaptation of British play
An Enemy of the People
FidelioG'day DiggerGaslight – adaptation of play by Patrick Hamilton
The Governess – adaptation of play by Patrick Hamilton
His ExcellencyI Pagliacci (1958) – operaIf It's a RoseThe LarkLast Call
Miss MabelThe Multi-Coloured Umbrella – adaptation of Australian stage playMurder StoryThe Public ProsecutorRose Without a ThornSixty Point BoldThe Small VictorySorry, Wrong Number 
Symphonie Pastorale
Three's Company – opera

1959

Act of Violence
Albert Herring – opera
Antony and Cleopatra – adaptation of ShakespeareBlack ChiffonBlack Limelight
Blue Murder – original Australian TV play
Bodgie – original Australian TV playCavalleria Rusticana – opera
Crime Passionel
A Dead Secret
Dinner with the Family
Hamlet
Lady in Danger – adaptation of 1942 Australian play
Misery Me
One Bright Day
One Morning Near Troodos – adaptation of BBC TV play
Outpost – original Australian play written for TV
Prima Donna (1959) – opera
Rita – opera (per a search of their website, National Archives may hold a copy)
The Seagull
The Skin of Our Teeth
The Soldier's Tale
The Strong are Lonely
Till Death Do Us Part
Treason
Trip Tease and High C's (1959)
Wuthering Heights

1960s

1960

The Bartered Bride (1960) – opera
Close to the Roof (1960) – TV play
The Dock Brief (1960) – TV play based on British play by John Mortimer
Even Unto Bethlehem (1960) – opera
Heart Attack
Il Seraglio (1960) – opera
The Life and Death of King Richard II (1960) – TV play
The Marriage of Figaro – opera
The Medium (1960) – opera
Ned Kelly (1960)
The Scent of Fear (1960)
The Slaughter of St Theresa's Day – based on Australian play by Peter Kenna
The Square Ring (1960) – TV play
Swamp Creatures (1960) – TV play
Turning Point (1960) – TV play
Venus Observed

1961

The Abduction from the Seraglio
The Big Client (1961)
Burst of Summer
Corinth House (1961)
Il Tabarro – opera
La Boheme
A Little South of Heaven
The Merchant of Venice
The Night of the Ding Dong (1961)
A Night Out
Samson and Delilah – opera
The Secret of Susannah – opera
The Sergeant from Burralee (1961) – TV play
The Tell-Tale Heart
Two Headed Eagle – based on an ITV play

1962

Boy Round the Corner – original Australian TV play
The Case of Private Hamp (1962)
The Consul – opera
The Devil Take Her – opera
Don Pasquale – opera
Fly by Night – original Australian TV play
Funnel Web – original Australian TV play
Hansel and Gretel – opera
The Hobby Horse – original Australian TV play
The House of Mancello – original Australian TV play
Jenny – original Australian TV play
La Serva Padrona – opera
The Land of Smiles – opera
L’Enfant Prodigue – opera
Lola Montez (1962)
Madame Butterfly – opera
My Three Angels – based on an American play by Samuel and Bella Spewack adapted from a French play
The Pearlfishers – opera
She'll Be Right
The Taming of the Shrew
The Teeth of the Wind – original Australian TV play

1963

Ballad for One Gun (1963) – TV play about Ned Kelly
Bastien and Bastienne – opera
A Dead Secret
Don't Listen Ladies (1963)
Fisher’s Ghost – opera
Flowering Cherry (1963) – based on play by Robert Bolt
The Long Sunset (1963) – based on play by R.C. Sheriff
Manon – opera
A Piece of Ribbon (1963)
The Right Thing (1963) – TV play
The Sentimental Bloke (1963)
Simone Boccanegra – opera
The Tempest
The White Carnation (1963)
The Young Victoria

1964
Cinderella – opera
I Pagliacci (No.2) – opera
Peter Grimes – opera
Tosca – opera

1965

Amelia Goes to the Ball – opera
The Big Killing
A Christmas Play – opera
The Gypsy Baron – opera
Louise (1965) – opera
Macbeth
Ring Out Wild Bells
Rusty Bugles
School for Fathers – opera
The Tape Recorder (1965)
Thirty-One Backyards (1965) – TV pkay
The Tower (1965)
What About Next Year (1965)

1966

Anonymous (1966)
The Attack (1966)
Blind Balance (1966)
The Decision (1966)
Easy Terms (1966)
Goodbye, Gloria, Hello! (1966)
The Gypsy Baron (1966) – opera
Maestro a Capella – opera
Marleen (1966)
Objector (1966)
The Paradise Shanty (1966)
A Small Wonder (1966)
Ticket to Nowhere (1966)
The Third Witness (1966)
V.I.P.P. (1966)

1967
The Brass Guitar (1967)
The Five-Sided Triangle, Or One Too Many (1967)
Shadow on the Wall (1967)
Slow Poison (1967)

1968
Fiends of the Family (1968) – based on novel by Pat Flower
The Shifting Heart (1968)

1969
The Cheerful Cuckold (1969)
The Torrents (1969) – based on Australian play by Oriel Grey

See also
 The Adventures of Long John Silver
 Autumn Affair – 1958–1959 Sydney-produced soap opera
 Emergency – 1959 Melbourne-produced series
 The House on the Corner (1957, ATN-7)
 List of television plays broadcast on ATN-7
 Shell Presents – one off plays on ATN-7/GTV-9, 1959–1960

References

External links
ABC Opera productions at Gore Hill

Australian Broadcasting Corporation original programming
Black-and-white Australian television shows
Plays
Television plays